The Fists of Vengeance is a 1972 Hong Kong film. It was produced under the Shaw Studios banner.

Cast
Chan Shen
Chen Yen-yen
Cheng Li
Cheng Miu
Goo Man Chung
Lily Li Li Li
Ling Yun
Dean Shek
Chan Wai Lau
Cho Kin

References

1972 films
Hong Kong action films
1970s action films
1970s Mandarin-language films
1970s Hong Kong films